The following lists events that happened during 1905 in Australia.

Incumbents

Monarch – Edward VII
Governor-General – Hallam Tennyson, 2nd Baron Tennyson (until 21 January), then Henry Northcote, 1st Baron Northcote
Prime Minister – George Reid (until 5 July), then Alfred Deakin
Chief Justice – Samuel Griffith

State premiers
Premier of New South Wales – Joseph Carruthers
Premier of South Australia – John Jenkins (until 1 March), then Richard Butler (until 26 July), then Thomas Price
Premier of Queensland – Arthur Morgan
Premier of Tasmania – John Evans
Premier of Western Australia – Henry Daglish (until 25 August), then Cornthwaite Rason
Premier of Victoria – Thomas Bent

State governors
Governor of New South Wales – Admiral Sir Harry Rawson
Governor of South Australia – Sir George Ruvthen Le Hunt
Governor of Queensland – Frederic Thesiger, 3rd Baron Chelmsford (from 30 November)
Governor of Tasmania – Sir Gerald Strickland
Governor of Western Australia – Admiral Sir Frederick Bedford
Governor of Victoria – Major General Sir Reginald Talbot

Events
 1 March – John Jenkins resigns as Premier of South Australia to become Agent-General for South Australia in London. He is replaced by Richard Butler.
 12 May – The first meeting of the Australian Council of Defence takes place between the Minister for Defence, the Treasurer, the Inspector-General Army, the Chief of Intelligence, and the Director of the Naval Forces.
 18 May – A state election takes place in Queensland, returning the government of Arthur Morgan. Women are able to vote in Queensland state elections for the first time.
 24 May – Empire Day is first celebrated in Australia.
 28 May – The town of Maryborough in Queensland experiences an outbreak of pneumonic plague.
 5 July – Alfred Deakin resumes office as Prime Minister of Australia after George Reid is unable to form a stable ministry.
 26 July – A state election is held in South Australia. The Labor Party led by Thomas Price forms a minority government.
 6 September – Last sighting of the clipper ship Loch Vennachar which sinks off Kangaroo Island, killing 32 people. Only one body was found.
 unknown dates
Non-aboriginal women are given the vote and admitted to the practice of law in Queensland.
Workers' compensation is introduced in Queensland.

Arts and literature

 Albert J. Hanson wins the Wynne Prize with The Blue Noon

Sport
 1 February – New South Wales wins the Sheffield Shield
 15 July – Australia first competes in the Davis Cup, in a combined Australasian team with New Zealand.
 30 September – Fitzroy wins the VFL premiership.
 7 November – Blue Spec wins the Melbourne Cup.
 Australia loses cricket series to England 0-2

Births
 10 January - Albert Arlen, pianist, composer, actor, and playwright (died 1993)
 15 February – Heathcote Howard Hammer, brigadier (died 1961)
 1 April – Paul Hasluck (died 1993), Governor General of Australia
 1 August – Eddie Gilbert (died 1978), cricketer

Deaths
 15 January – George Thorn (born 1838), Premier of Queensland
 6 May – Robert Herbert (born 1831), Premier of Queensland
 25 June – Augustus Gregory (born 1819), explorer
 5 July – Henry Baylis (born 1826), police magistrate
 30 October – Boyd Dunlop Morehead (born 1843), Premier of Queensland
 29 December – Victor Daley (born 1858), poet

See also
1900s (decade)

References

 
Australia
Years of the 20th century in Australia